Il mestiere della vita is the sixth studio album by Italian singer-songwriter Tiziano Ferro, released on 2 December 2016. Ferro has called it the beginning of the second chapter of his career, after the first chapter was concluded by the release of his first greatest hits album. The album sees Ferro return to a more modern and electronic style.

The Spanish version of the album is titled El oficio de la vida and includes a duet with Vanesa Martín.

Singles
The album's lead single was "Potremmo ritornare", released on 28 October 2016. The ballad debuted on top of the Italian Singles Chart, becoming Ferro's first number-one hit since "Alla mia età".

Track listing

Charts

Weekly charts
Il mestiere della vita

El oficio de la vida

Year-end charts

Certifications

References

Tiziano Ferro albums
2016 albums
Italian-language albums
Spanish-language albums
Albums produced by Michele Canova